Cyrtodactylus arcanus is a species of gecko that is endemic to Papua New Guinea.

References

Cyrtodactylus
Reptiles described in 2012